River Basin Development Authorities in Nigeria are government agencies involved in the management of water resources for agriculture and other uses. Each authority operates in an assigned geo-morphological and political boundary and work to improve agriculture and rural development through irrigation, control of river pollution and also to assist farmers in processing food crops.

River basin authorities operations have been influenced by Nigeria's economic and political changes, ten years after they were established their impact has been minimal.

Background 
Concerns about sustainable food production in Nigeria after the Sahel drought of the early 1970s and a decline in agricultural output following Nigeria's oil boom led to ideas about investing in sustainable food production and managing water resources.  Plans were then developed to create government agencies spread out within the country based on the drainage systems of various rivers. In 1973, two river basin authorities were established for  Sokoto River and Lake Chad basin.

In 1976, the law establishing the River Basin Development Authorities listed eleven agencies with the mandate to develop water resources to boost agricultural productions. Water resource management to support irrigable crops was one of the crucial mandates of the river basin authorities.

When a democratic administration came into power in 1979, improved capital expenditure was allocated to the river basin authorities, some of which were in states controlled by the opposition but political consideration in choice of contractors and board personnel.

In 1984, new basin authorities were created for each state, an increase to 19 from the original eleven basins. However, this restructuring did not last as a new regime reverted to the previous eleven.

The river basin authorities 

 Chad Basin Development Authority - areas surrounding the Lake Chad Basin.
 Upper Benue River Basin Development Authority - areas drained by the Benue River and its tributaries from the international boundary to Pai and Donga River.
 Lower Benue River Basin Development Authority - catchment area are those within the confluence of Benue and Niger Rivers.
 Cross River Basin Development Authority - catchment area are places drained by the Cross River and tributaries.
 Anambra - Imo River Basin Development Authority - East of Niger River in areas drained by Rivers Imo and Anambra.
 Niger River Basin Development Authority - areas drained by the Niger River starting in the North from the river's confluence with Malendo River and down to Niger River's confluence with Ubo River.
 Ogun Osun River Basin Development Authority
 Benin - Owena River Basin Development Authority
 Niger Delta River Basin Development Authority
 Sokoto - Rima River Basin Development Authority
 Hadejia - Jama're River Basin Development Authority.
 Upper Niger River - Niger, Kaduna and FCT

List Of Directors for All states River basin Authority  

 ANAMBRA-IMO RIVER BASIN DEVELOPMENT AUTHORITY
NAME -	DESIGNATION
 Michael Nwabufo -	Managing Director
 Michael Nwachukwu 	- Director Engineering
 Nweze Obasi- 	Director Agricultural Services
 Benjamin Aneke- 	Director Planning and Design
 Ngozi Uche 	-Director Finance and Administration

 BENUE-OWENA RIVER BASIN DEVELOPMENT AUTHORITY
NAME 	- DESIGNATION
 Saliu Ahmed -	Managing Director
 Modupe Olalemi 	- Director Engineering
 Agbetuyi Bamidele 	- Director Agricultural Services
 Olumese Charles 	- Director Planning and Design
 Akinya Folorunsho Samson -	Director Finance and Administration

 CHAD RIVER BASIN DEVELOPMENT AUTHORITY
NAME 	-DESIGNATION
 Abba Garba 	Managing Director
 Babagana Uroma 	Director Engineering
 Abdul Tashikalma 	Director Agricultural Services
 Modu Surum 	Director Planning and Design
 Falmata Maina Dalatu 	Director Finance and Administration

 CROSS RIVER BASIN DEVELOPMENT AUTHORITY
NAME 	- DESIGNATION
 Bassey Nkposong - 	Managing Director
 Esin Winston Mosembe - 	Director Engineering
 U.A. Essien 	- Director Agricultural Services
 I.I. Udoh - 	Director Planning and Design
 Okpata Egbe 	- Director Finance and Administration

 HADEJIA-JEMA’ARE RIVER BASIN DEVELOPMENT AUTHORITY
NAME 	- DESIGNATION
 Ado Khalid Abdullahi 	- Managing Director
 Abubakar Mohammed 	- Director Engineering
 Ma’amun Da’u Aliyu 	- Director Agricultural Services
 Mohammed Umar Kura 	- Director Planning and Design
 Mohammed Awwal Wada 	- Director Finance and Administration

 LOWER BENUE RIVER BASIN DEVELOPMENT AUTHORITY
NAME 	- DESIGNATION
 Mahmoud Adra 	- Managing Director
 Mathias Udoyi-  	Director Engineering
 Samuel Ochai 	- Director Agricultural Services
 Emmanuel Yepwi 	- Director Planning and Design
 Richard Ndidi 	- Director Finance and Administration

 LOWER NIGER RIVER BASIN DEVELOPMENT AUTHORITY
NAME 	- DESIGNATION
 Adeniyi Saheed Aremu 	- Managing Director
 Abdulkarim Mohammed Bello 	- Director Engineering
 Tajuddeen Affinih 	- Director Agricultural Services
 Olawale Victor 	- Director Planning and Design
 Abu Atsumbe Abdullahi 	- Director Finance and Administration

 NIGER DELTA RIVER BASIN DEVELOPMENT AUTHORITY
NAME 	- DESIGNATION
 Tonye David-West 	- Managing Director
 Okwonu Benson 	- Director Engineering
 Ikuromo Joshua 	- Director Agricultural Services
 Austen Pabor 	- Director Planning and Design
 Isaac Akpoede Otuorimo 	- Director Finance and Administration

 OGUN-OSUN RIVER BASIN DEVELOPMENT AUTHORITY
NAME 	- DESIGNATION
 Olatunji Babalola	- Managing Director
 Iyiola Rufus 	- Director Engineering
 Bolanle Olaniyan 	- Director Agricultural Services
 Adesanya Mutiu Omoniyi - 	Director Planning and Design
 Olayiwola Baruwa-  	Director Finance and Administration

 SOKOTO-RIMA RIVER BASIN DEVELOPMENT AUTHORITY
NAME 	- DESIGNATION
 Olayiwola A. Baruwa 	- Managing Director
 Jafar Sadeeq 	- Director Engineering
 Sanusi Mai-Afu 	- Director Agricultural Services
 Murtala Dalhatu 	- Director Planning and Design
 Faruk Madugu Gwandu 	- Director Finance and Administration

 UPPER BENUE RIVER BASIN DEVELOPMENT AUTHORITY
NAME 	- DESIGNATION
 Abubakar Muazu 	- Managing Director
 Mukhtar Umar Isa 	- Director Engineering
 Abdulhameed Girei 	- Director Agricultural Services
 Yusuf Daniel Ajemasu 	- Director Planning and Design
 Haruna Musa 	- Director Finance and Administration

 UPPER NIGER RIVER BASIN DEVELOPMENT AUTHORITY

NAME 	- DESIGNATION
 Abdulkarim Ali 	- Managing Director
 David Emmanuel 	- Director Engineering
 Abdu Aminu Omar 	- Director Agricultural Services
 John Bature Gimba 	- Director Planning and Design
 Alhassan Bawa Ugbada 	- Director Finance and Administration

References 

Water management authorities in Nigeria